Loropeni is a department or commune of Poni Province in southern Burkina Faso. Its capital lies at the town of Loropeni.

Towns and villages
Its capital lies at the town of Loropeni.

Places of interest

The Department is home to Burkina Faso's first UNESCO World Heritage site, the Ruins of Loropéni, which was added to the UNESCO World Heritage List in 2009.

References

Departments of Burkina Faso
Poni Province